Sir Thomas Dalmahoy Barlow,  (23 February 1883 – 22 November 1964) was a British businessman, banker, and art collector and historian.

Barlow was the second son of the royal physician Sir Thomas Barlow, 1st Baronet, and his wife Ada Dalmahoy. His brother was Alan Barlow, 2nd Bt. He was educated at Marlborough College and Trinity College, Cambridge.

He married Esther Sophia Gaselee on 15 February 1911, and they had three children:

 Theodora Gertrude Barlow (born 21 February 1912)
 Penelope Sophia Barlow (10 April 1914 − 1995)
 Basil Stephen Barlow (15 February 1918 – 15 October 1991)

He was made Knight Commander of the Order of the British Empire in 1934 and promoted to Knight Grand Cross of the Order of the British Empire in 1946.

References
 ‘BARLOW, Sir Thomas Dalmahoy’, Who Was Who, A & C Black, an imprint of Bloomsbury Publishing plc, 1920–2008; online edn, Oxford University Press, Dec 2007 accessed 7 March 2013
 Gordon Russell, ‘Barlow, Sir Thomas Dalmahoy (1883–1964)’, rev. Oxford Dictionary of National Biography, Oxford University Press, 2004 accessed 7 March 2013

1883 births
1964 deaths
Younger sons of baronets
People educated at Marlborough College
Knights Grand Cross of the Order of the British Empire
Alumni of Trinity College, Cambridge
English bankers
English art historians
English art collectors
People from Blackburn
20th-century English businesspeople